Phacotaceae is a family of green algae in the order Chlamydomonadales.

References

External links

Chlamydomonadales
Chlorophyceae families